Middenmeer Aerodrome is a small airfield in the town of Middenmeer,  Netherlands. It is located southeast of Den Helder.

During the beginning of the Second World War a military airstrip existed in the area, from which the Royal Netherlands Air Force deployed Fokker C.V and Fokker C.X aircraft for bombing and reconnaissance missions against the German military. The south-west corner of the current airfield touches the north-east corner of the former military airfield.

As of 2012, the airfield has a single grass runway, 05/23, 600 metres (1,968 feet) long. It is used exclusively by ultralight aviation, the short grass runway not being able to support heavier aircraft.

References

External links
  Flying Club Wieringermeer (Dutch only)
 Photos taken at Middenmeer (EHMM) from Jetphotos.net

Airports in North Holland
Hollands Kroon